The Mercer Bears women's basketball team represents Mercer University in Macon, Georgia, United States. The school's team currently competes in the Southern Conference.

History
Mercer began play in 1970. As of the end of the 2017–18 Southern Conference season, they have an all-time record of 688–670. Mercer played in the Southern Women's Athletic Conference for one season (1971–72) before joining the Georgia AIAW in 1972, playing until 1981. In the 1973 AIAW Tournament, they beat Long Beach State 55–46 before losing to South Connecticut State 58–46 in the Quarterfinals. They lost to Texas in the 1980 AIAW National Division I Basketball Championship 81–80. They played as an independent from 1982 to 1985 before joining the New South Women's Athletic Conference in 1985. The conference merged with the Trans-America Athletic Conference in 1991, with the conference name changing to the Atlantic Sun Conference in 2001. Mercer played in the conference until 2014, when they joined the Southern Conference. Mercer played in the 1985 NCAA Division II basketball tournament, making the Final Four after beating North Alabama 90–86 (in OT) and Quinnipiac 86–76 before losing to Central Missouri 82–79. The Bears did not make another postseason appearance until the 2013 Women's Basketball Invitational. They made the WBI again in 2015 and the WNIT in 2016. The Bears won their second-straight Division I conference championship in 2019, defeating Furman 68–66 to win the Southern Conference Title, earning their second appearance in the Division I NCAA basketball tournament.

Postseason

NCAA Division I tournament results
The Bears have appeared in the NCAA Division I Tournament four times. Their combined record is 0–4.

NCAA Division II tournament results
The Bears appeared in one NCAA Division II Tournament. Their combined record was 2–1.

References

External links